Pleasant Local High School, also known as Pleasant High School and Marion Pleasant High School, is a public high school in Pleasant Township, near Marion, Ohio.  It is the only high school in the Pleasant Local School District. Student enrollment was at 369 as of October 2017.

Athletics 
 Baseball
 Boys' Basketball
 Girls' Basketball
 Bowling
 Cross Country
 Football
 Golf
 Boys & Girls Soccer
 Softball
 Swimming
 Boys' Tennis
 Girls' Tennis
 Track & Field
 Girls' Volleyball
 Wrestling

Pleasant is a member of the Ohio High School Athletic Association and the Mid-Ohio Athletic Conference.  Pleasant has won the overall Mid-Ohio Athletic Conference (MOAC) All Sports Championship 14 times (11 in the last 14 years) since the MOAC began in 1990.  The 2011–12 season was notable due to the football team finishing with a 10–0 for the regular season, winning their 17th straight MOAC title, and making the state playoffs for the 17th time. The volleyball team finished with a 23–3 record, winning their 8th straight MOAC Championship.

Ohio High School Athletic Association State Championships

 Boys' Baseball – 2001, 2006 
 Boys' Basketball – 1973 
 Boys' Football – 1971, 1972, 1996, 2002 
 Boys' Golf – 1989 
 Boys' Track and Field – 2002 
Wrestling State Duals- 2007,2008

External links
 District website

Notes and references

High schools in Marion County, Ohio
Public high schools in Ohio